Samsong is a Nigerian gospel artist, based in Abuja, Nigeria. He has had a successful recording career with radio hits like Bianule, and a handful of accolades such as The Psalmist Award in 2000, and recently being nominated as "best Gospel Artist" by Nigerian Entertainment Awards (NEA) in New York in 2008. He has graced the stage with Gospel greats like Marvin Winans, Donnie McClurkin and Panam Percy Paul, as well as successful mainstream artists like Donell Jones, Kenny Latimore, 112, 2Baba, D’Banj, Faze, and Styl Plus.

Early life 
Samsong was born on November 30, 1974, his real names are Samson Uche Mogekwu born in Delta State, Nigeria. He discovered his talent for singing while in high school. It was also in high school he was monikered Samsong.

Education 
He attended college, and majored in Accounting and graduated from the great Ambrose Alli University, Ekpoma, Edo state.

Career 
Samsong formed a quartet known as Praise Creation. They were signed to Ivory Music Label, and released their debut album in 1996 titled "Best of Life".

The group however broke up, and Samsong became a solo artist, releasing his debut CD in 2002, titled "Count Your Blessings". His album was a success, garnering airplay, and resulting in winning The Psalmist Award that same year. (1) His sophomore cd was released in 2004, titled "Still Counting". Samsong had become a bona fide celebrity and gospel star at this point, having songs and video in rotation radio and TV, and receiving top billing in concerts.

Samsong is currently working on a summer release of his new cd.

Discography 
 Best of Life (with Praise Creation) (1996)
 Count Your Blessings (2002)
 Still Counting (2004)
 The World of My Dreams (2007)
 Church Boy (2010)
 On Top of The World (2015)

Awards and recognition 
He continued his award-winning streak, snagging The Best Male Vocalist of the Year Award at Today's Music Award in 2004, and Best Male Vocalist of The Year Award in 2005 at The Amen Awards. At The Vigoma Awards in 2005, he received The Best Video of The Year Award.
His third release titled "The World of My Dreams" was issued in 2007, and was his most ambitious release yet. It featured a remake of the mega hit "One Love" by music icon Onyeka Onwenu, in which he performed a duet with her. The cd also featured a duet with international superstars Styl-Plus titled Live Right. His ambitious output was recognized with and he was awarded with The Grace Honorary Award for Excellence, that same year. In 2008, he was nominated for The Best Gospel Artist at The Nigerian Entertainment Awards (NEA) held in New York City.
He embarked on an international tour to promote his cd, with stops at South Africa, the United Kingdom and Germany. In Germany, he had recorded and performed with Chris Lass, the famous German gospel producer and artist.
His most recent headlining tour was in August 2009. He toured the island of Seychelles, and was privileged to have dinner with the Vice President, Joseph Belmont.

See also
 List of Igbo people
 List of Nigerian gospel musicians
 List of Nigerian musicians

References

External links
Official Website
Samsong on YouTube
Samsong on MySpace

1974 births
Nigerian gospel singers
Nigerian male singer-songwriters
Living people
People from Delta State
Musicians from Delta State
Nigerian rhythm and blues singer-songwriters
21st-century Nigerian male singers